Rūdolfs Balcers (born 8 April 1997) is a Latvian professional ice hockey forward for the Syracuse Crunch of the American Hockey League (AHL) while under contract to the Tampa Bay Lightning of the National Hockey League (NHL). He was selected by the San Jose Sharks, 142nd overall, in the 2015 NHL Entry Draft. Balcers played three seasons for the Stavanger Oilers before moving to North America in 2016, where he spent one season with the Kamloops Blazers of the Western Hockey League (WHL). After one season in the American Hockey League (AHL) with the Sharks minor league affiliate, the San Jose Barracuda, Balcers was traded to the Ottawa Senators in 2018, and made his NHL debut with the team in 2019. He rejoined the Sharks in 2021.

Playing career
As a junior, Balcers played in Norway with Lørenskog until joining the Stavanger Oilers in the 2013–14 season. The youngest player on the Oilers in 2014–15, he recorded 21 points in 38 regular season as the club won the league championship, and was selected by the San Jose Sharks in the fifth round, 142nd overall, at the 2015 NHL Entry Draft.

After three seasons with Stavanger Oilers he moved to continue his development in North America, joining major junior club the Kamloops Blazers of the Western Hockey League (WHL) for the 2016–17 season. Balcers made a seamless transition to the WHL appearing in 66 games with the Blazers, finishing with 40 goals, the most on the team.

Having experienced a successful season with Blazers, he was signed to a three-year, entry-level contract with his draft team, the San Jose Sharks, on 13 July 2017. After attending the Sharks 2017 training camp, he was assigned by the Sharks to begin his North American professional career with AHL affiliate, the San Jose Barracuda. In the 2017–18 season, Balcers led the Barrcuda with 23 goals and 25 assists for 48 points in 67 games. He was selected to represent the Barracuda at the 2018 All-Star Classic.

In September 2018, Balcers was traded by the Sharks to the Ottawa Senators as part of a package of players, prospects and draft picks for Erik Karlsson. Assigned to the Senators' AHL affiliate the Belleville Senators to start the season, Balcers was leading the team in goals and points when he was recalled by Ottawa in early January 2019. He made his NHL debut with the Senators on 5 January 2019, against the Minnesota Wild, and scored his first goal in the next game, on 6 January against the Carolina Hurricanes.

After missing most of the 2019–20 season with an MCL injury, Balcers signed a one-year, two-way contract with the Senators in October 2020. Shortly after that, he was loaned back to Stavanger until the start of the delayed 2020–21 season. Balcers compiled seven goals and eight assists in just 10 games in his return with the Stavanger Oilers before returning to the Senators organization.

Approaching the conclusion of training camp, Balcers was placed on waivers by the Senators and subsequently claimed by his original club, the San Jose Sharks, on 12 January 2021. He scored his first goal for the Sharks, in a 5–4 win over the St. Louis Blues on 20 February 2021. On 22 July 2021, Balcers signed a two-year, $3.1 million contract with the Sharks.

Following the 2021–22 season, despite having recorded career best marks with 11 goals and 23 points through 61 regular season games, Balcers was placed on unconditional waivers by the Sharks in order to buyout the remaining season of his contract on 12 July 2022. On 14 July, Balcers as a free agent agreed to a one-year, $750,000 contract with the Florida Panthers. He made his Panthers debut on the opening night of the 2022–23 season, in a 3–1 victory over the New York Islanders on 13 October.

Despite contributing with two goals and two assists through 14 games with the Panthers, Balcers was placed on waivers due to other roster considerations on 11 November 2022. The following day on 12 November, Balcers was claimed off waivers by rival club, the Tampa Bay Lightning.

International play
After representing Latvia at the junior level, Balcers was selected by head coach Bob Hartley for the 2018 World Championship. In his senior debut game against Norway, he scored two goals including the overtime-winning goal. The four goals and six points he scored in eight games led the Latvian team.

Career statistics

Regular season and playoffs

International

Awards and honours

References

External links
 

1997 births
Living people
Belleville Senators players
Expatriate ice hockey players in Canada
Expatriate ice hockey players in Norway
Expatriate ice hockey players in the United States
Florida Panthers players
Kamloops Blazers players
Latvian expatriate ice hockey people
Latvian expatriate sportspeople in Canada
Latvian expatriate sportspeople in Norway
Latvian expatriate sportspeople in the United States
Latvian ice hockey left wingers
Ottawa Senators players
San Jose Barracuda players
San Jose Sharks draft picks
San Jose Sharks players
Sportspeople from Liepāja
Stavanger Oilers players
Syracuse Crunch players
Tampa Bay Lightning players